A Samoan by-election was held in the Faasaleleaga No. 2 constituency on 24 September 2006. The by-election was precipitated by the election of Pau Sefo Pau being declared invalid.  It was contested by six candidates, and won by Pau's daughter, Rita Pau Letoa.

Candidates
 Rita Pau Letoa (Human Rights Protection Party (HRPP))
 Namulauulu Vavae Tuilagi
 Papalii Samuelu Petaia
 Namulauulu Netina

References

By-elections to the Legislative Assembly of Samoa
Samoa
Faasaleleaga